Anthony Grant (born 4 August 1989 in Kingston, Jamaica) is a Jamaican footballer who currently plays for the St. Louis Ambush in the Major Arena Soccer League.

Career

Youth and Amateur
Grant played two years of college soccer at McKendree University in 2010 and 2011, before transferring to Bowling Green University for 2012 and 2013.

Following his final season at Bowling Green, Grant played indoor soccer with Syracuse Silver Knights in 2013, and played two seasons with USL PDL side Seacoast United Phantoms.

Professional
Grant signed with United Soccer League side Richmond Kickers on 20 August 2015.

Grant signed with the Silver Knights in October 2015.

Grant currently plays for the Kansas City Comets (MASL), 2018.

References

External links

 
 Bowling Green profile

1989 births
Living people
Jamaican footballers
Bowling Green Falcons men's soccer players
Flint City Bucks players
Syracuse Silver Knights players
Seacoast United Phantoms players
Richmond Kickers players
USL League Two players
USL Championship players
National Independent Soccer Association players
Expatriate soccer players in the United States
Jamaican expatriate footballers
Jamaican expatriate sportspeople in the United States
UWI F.C. players
Stumptown AC players
Association football forwards
Major Arena Soccer League players
Missouri Comets players
Sportspeople from Kingston, Jamaica
St. Louis Ambush (2013–) players
McKendree Bearcats